Roberto Kalb is a Mexican-born conductor, composer, and pianist, currently living in Berlin, Germany. As a conductor, he is praised for his musicianship and clarity.

Education 
Kalb attended the San Francisco Conservatory of Music, receiving a Bachelor of Arts in composition. He then attended the University of Michigan, receiving a Masters of Music in composition. He later pursued a dual Doctoral of Musical Arts in Composition from The New England Conservatory of Music and conducting from the University of Michigan. In 2012, Kalb was awarded The American Prize in orchestral composition for his piece, Mascaras. He has also received several other distinctions, including 2nd place in the Washington International Composition Competition, and first place in the Ann Arbor Symphony Sight and Sound Competition.

Career 
In 2021, Kalb was the recipient of the Solti Foundation U.S Career Assistantship Award.

On June 5, 2022, Kalb conducted Opera Theatre of Saint Louis's premiere of American composer Tobias Picker's opera Awakenings. Later that year, in November, he was appointed the second Music Director of Detroit Opera following David DiChiera's tenure in the role.

Personal life 
Kalb is married to soprano Mane Galoyan.

Compositions 

 Mascaras (orchestra)
 Le Dormeur du Val (piano trio)
 Ryden Scenes (string quartet)
 String Quartet No. 1

References

External links
 

Year of birth missing (living people)
Mexican conductors (music)
21st-century conductors (music)
Mexican male classical composers
Mexican classical composers
Living people
Male conductors (music)
21st-century Mexican male musicians
21st-century Mexican musicians
21st-century classical composers
San Francisco Conservatory of Music alumni
University of Michigan alumni
New England Conservatory alumni
Music directors (opera)